Suastus, whose members are called palm bobs, is a genus of grass skipper butterflies in the family Hesperiidae.

Species
Suastus gremius (Fabricius, 1798) South India, Northwest Himalayas to Burma, Thailand, Laos, Vietnam, Hainan, Hong Kong, Formosa, Langkawi, Malaya, Sri Lanka, Sumba, Indian palm bob
Suastus minuta (Moore, 1877) South India, Sikkim to Burma, Sri Lanka, Thailand, Laos, Hainan, Vietnam and Malaya, Small palm bob
Suastus everyx (Mabille, 1883) Burma, Thailand, Malaya, Borneo, Sumatra, Java, Bali, White palm bob
Suastus migreus (Semper, 1892) Philippines

Biology 
The larvae feed on Palmae including Arenga, Borassus, Caryota, Chamaerops, Cocos , Licuala, Phoenix, Rhapis , Trachycarpus, Calamus

References

Natural History Museum Lepidoptera genus database
Suastus  Moore, 1881 at Markku Savela's Lepidoptera and Some Other Life Forms

Hesperiinae
Hesperiidae genera